Mark-Emilio Papazov (Bulgarian: Марк-Емилио Папазов; born 8 October 2002) is a Bulgarian footballer who plays as a striker for Hebar Pazardzhik, on loan from CSKA Sofia.

Career
Papazov completed his league debut for CSKA Sofia on 10 July 2022 in a match against Arda Kardzhali. On 12 January 2023 he was send on loan to Hebar Pazardzhik for the rest of the season. Papazov made his debut for the team in a league match on 11 February against CSKA 1948.

International career
On 18 March 2023, he was called-up for the Bulgaria U21 for the friendly tournament Antalya Cup between 25 and 28 March 2023.

References

External links
 

2002 births
Living people
Bulgarian footballers
Bulgaria youth international footballers
PFC CSKA Sofia players
PFC Litex Lovech players
FC Hebar Pazardzhik players
First Professional Football League (Bulgaria) players
Association football midfielders